Sadin Kola (also Romanized as Sa‘dīn Kolā) is a village in Harazpey-ye Jonubi Rural District, in the Central District of Amol County, Mazandaran Province, Iran. At the 2006 census, its population was 388, in 105 families.

References 

Populated places in Amol County